James Nyakuni is a businessman and entrepreneur in Uganda. He is the founder, owner, and managing director of Gaagaa Bus Services Limited. He was reported in 2007 to be one of the wealthiest individuals in Uganda.

Background
He was born in Arua District, circa 1970. He dropped out of school in Primary 7. He started out by making earthen building bricks. He then rented a stall in the market, where he sold fabricated metal products. Later, he opened a shop selling bicycle parts. When he started trading in cigarettes and automobile fuel, his business required him to travel to Nairobi, Kenya several times a year. On such trips, he learned new business skills and made new business contacts. He followed up by opening a second shop across the border in northeastern Democratic Republic of the Congo. Finally, he entered the transportation business.

Businesses and investments
His business interests include the Coca-Cola distribution franchise for the West Nile sub-region, Gaagaa Bus Services Limited, whose vehicles offer round-the clock transportation between Arua and Kampala, apartment complexes and other rental real estate in Arua and Kampala, and a fleet of long-haul trucks.

See also
 List of wealthiest people in Uganda

References

External links
Gaagaa boss accounts frozen over UN report

1970 births
Living people
Ugandan businesspeople
People from Arua District
People from Northern Region, Uganda
People from West Nile sub-region